Marcelo Antônio de Oliveira (born 17 July 1996 in Cascavel), known as Marcelinho, is a Brazilian professional footballer who plays for Londrina as a winger.

Football career
Marcelinho began playing football with Foz do Iguaçu Futebol Clube, where he was loaned to Estanciano, Clube Atlético Linense and FC Shukura Kobuleti. He played professional in Campeonato Brasileiro Série B with Londrina Esporte Clube, making seven appearances for the club during the 2019 season.

On 1 July 2019, Marcelinho signed a four years contract with Marítimo

References

External links

1996 births
Living people
People from Cascavel
Brazilian footballers
Foz do Iguaçu Futebol Clube players
Londrina Esporte Clube players
Clube Atlético Linense players
FC Shukura Kobuleti players
C.S. Marítimo players
F.C. Vizela players
Campeonato Brasileiro Série B players
Campeonato Brasileiro Série D players
Erovnuli Liga players
Primeira Liga players
Brazilian expatriate footballers
Expatriate footballers in Portugal
Expatriate footballers in Georgia (country)
Brazilian expatriate sportspeople in Portugal
Brazilian expatriate sportspeople in Georgia (country)
Association football defenders
Sportspeople from Paraná (state)